Lieutenant General Salou Djibo (born 15 April 1965) is a Nigerien Army officer. After President Mamadou Tandja's attempts to remain in power after the end of his term, Djibo led the military coup of 18 February 2010 that ousted Tandja, after which he became the head of the Supreme Council for the Restoration of Democracy. The Supreme Council returned power to a new civil government after the 2011 elections.

Early and family life
Salou Djibo was born in 1965 in Namaro, a village and rural commune in Niger close to the River Niger.  He is of Zarma ancestry. Djibo is married and has five children.

Military career
In 1995, Djibo underwent military training in Bouaké, Côte d'Ivoire before commencing officer training in 1996. He was commissioned as a second lieutenant in 1997 and gained further promotions to lieutenant in 1998, captain in 2003 and chef d'escadron (major) in October 2006. Djibo has also received training in Morocco and China.

Amongst Djibo's several posts, he was an instructor at the Agadez military center, platoon commander, commandant, 121 Compagnie de Commandement d'Appui et des Services, and commander of the garrison at Niger's capital Niamey.

Djibo served in United Nations peacekeeping forces in Côte d'Ivoire (2004) and the Democratic Republic of the Congo (2006).

2010 coup
His military government announced its intentions to make Niger "a model of democracy and good governance."

Recent
Djibo announced that he would be running as a candidate in the 2020 Nigerien presidential election.

See also
 1974 Nigerien coup d'état
 1996 Nigerien coup d'état
 1999 Nigerien coup d'état
 2009–10 Nigerien constitutional crisis
 2010 Nigerien coup d'état
 Mahamadou Danda
 Mamadou Tandja
 Seyni Oumarou

References

External links
Address by Lieutenant-General Salou Djibo, President of the Supreme Council for Restoration of Democracy, at the 65th Session of the General Assembly of the United Nations, September 23, 2010 (video, dubbed in English)

1965 births
Living people
Leaders who took power by coup
Nigerien military personnel
Presidents of Niger
People from Tillabéri Region
Zarma people